Bochalema is a Colombian municipality and town located in the department of North Santander.

References
  Bochalema official website 

Municipalities of the Norte de Santander Department